Nerijus Valskis (born 4 August 1987) is a Lithuanian professional footballer who plays as a forward for Kauno Žalgiris and Lithuania national team.

Club career

Earlier career
Valskis began his senior club career in 2005 at FK Žalgiris of Lithuanian A Lyga, where he made 11 appearances before moving to Kauno Jėgeriai. During 2007–2008 season, he appeared for  FK Šilutė and scored 4 goals in 37 league matches. He later moved to another A Lyga outfit FBK Kaunas, where he scored 17 goals in two different seasons (2008 and 2010).

Belarus and Latvia
In 2009, he arrived in Belarus and signed with Belarusian Premier League side FC Smorgon. In 2011, he played for FC Smorgon in the Latvian Higher League where he scored 8 goals in 27 league matches. He then came back to Belarus with Minsk and he was in the 2011–12 Belarusian Cup Runners-up squad.

Lithuania
After several successful stints in foreign clubs, he returned to Lithuania and signed with giants FK Sūduva. During the 2013 A Lyga season, while playing for Sūduva, Valskis was awarded the Best Player and was also the league's leading scorer with 27 goals.

Poland
In 2014, Valskis signed for CS Universitatea Craiova of Romanian Liga I and appeared in 15 league games before moving to Polish club Wigry Suwałki.

Back to Lithuania
He returned to Lithuania with FK Riteriai during the 2015–2016 season. With the club, He scored 24 goals in 43 league matches. Valskis was in FK Riteriai's squad in that season, which finished runners-up in their domestic tournaments; A Lyga, Lithuanian Supercup and Lithuanian Football Cup.

More foreign stints
He went to Israel and played for Bnei Yehuda Tel Aviv in the 2017–2018 season. Valskis was part of Bnei Yehuda Tel Aviv squad which won the Israeli State Cup in 2017. 

Valskis in 2018, moved to Thailand and appeared with Ratchaburi Mitr Phol in 15 Thai League 1 matches, scoring 9 goals.

Israel
After his previous appearances with Israeli side Bnei Yehuda, Valskis again came back to Israeli Premier League with Hapoel Tel Aviv in 2019. He signed for Hapoel Tel Aviv on a short-term contract until the end of the 2018–19 Israeli Premier League season. He scored only 1 goal in 10 league matches before moving to India.

India
Following his second stint in Israel, Valskis joined Indian Super League side Chennaiyin in July 2019. In his debut season in India, Valskis was the league's top goal scorer with 15 goals, winning the ISL golden boot. His goals helped to lead the club to the final of the Super League on 14 March 2020; he scored in the showpiece match but Chennaiyin lost 3–1 to ATK.

On 21 August 2020, after parting ways with Chennaiyin, Valskis signed a two year contract with fellow Super League club Jamshedpur FC, reuniting with former boss Owen Coyle. He scored 8 goals for Jamshedpur in the 2020–21 Indian Super League season.

He returned to Chennaiyin on 1 January 2022 in the mid season of ISL 2021–22.

International career
While playing for FK Sūduva, Valskis was called up in the national squad of Lithuania in 2013. He made his debut on 11 October, against Latvia in a 2014  FIFA World Cup qualification match.

He scored his only goal for his country against Estonia in the 2016 Baltic Cup. In that competition, Lithuania finished as the Runners-up.

From 2013, he has appeared in 24 international matches and represented Lithuania in competitions like Baltic Cup and UEFA Nations League alongside Euro Cup, 2014 FIFA World Cup and 2018 FIFA World Cup qualifiers.

Career statistics

Club

International goals
As of match played 29 May 2016. Lithuania score listed first, score column indicates score after each Valskis goal.

Honours
Country
Lithuania
Baltic Cup runner-up: 2016
Club
FBK Kaunas
Baltic League: 2008
FBK Kaunas
A Lyga: 2007
Liepājas Metalurgs
Latvian Football Cup runner-up: 2010–11
Minsk
Belarusian Cup runner-up: 2011–12
FK Riteriai
A Lyga runner-up: 2015, 2016
Lithuanian Cup runner-up: 2016
Lithuanian Supercup runner-up: 2016
Bnei Yehuda Tel Aviv
Israel State Cup: 2016–17
Israel Super Cup runner-up: 2017
Chennaiyin
Indian Super League runner-up: 2019–20

Individual
A Lyga
(Top scorer): 2013 (27 goals)
A Lyga
(Best Player): 2013
Indian Super League 
(Golden Boot): 2019–20

References

External links
 Nerijus Valskis player profile at footballcritic.com 
 

1987 births
Living people
Sportspeople from Klaipėda
Lithuanian footballers
Association football midfielders
FK Žalgiris players
FK Šilutė players
FBK Kaunas footballers
FC Smorgon players
FK Liepājas Metalurgs players
FC Minsk players
FK Sūduva Marijampolė players
CS Universitatea Craiova players
Wigry Suwałki players
FK Riteriai players
Bnei Yehuda Tel Aviv F.C. players
Nerijus Valskis
Hapoel Tel Aviv F.C. players
Chennaiyin FC players
Jamshedpur FC players
FK Kauno Žalgiris players
A Lyga players
I Lyga players
Belarusian Premier League players
Latvian Higher League players
Liga II players
I liga players
Israeli Premier League players
Nerijus Valskis
Indian Super League players
Lithuania under-21 international footballers
Lithuania international footballers
Lithuanian expatriate footballers
Lithuanian expatriate sportspeople in Belarus
Lithuanian expatriate sportspeople in Latvia
Lithuanian expatriate sportspeople in Romania
Lithuanian expatriate sportspeople in Poland
Lithuanian expatriate sportspeople in Israel
Lithuanian expatriate sportspeople in Thailand
Lithuanian expatriate sportspeople in India
Expatriate footballers in Belarus
Expatriate footballers in Latvia
Expatriate footballers in Romania
Expatriate footballers in Poland
Expatriate footballers in Israel
Expatriate footballers in Thailand
Expatriate footballers in India